Lochmere is an unincorporated community in the towns of Tilton and Belmont in Belknap County, New Hampshire, in the United States. It is located along U.S. Route 3 and New Hampshire Route 11, which connect the village with Laconia to the northeast and to the center of Tilton and to Franklin to the southwest. It is close to the Winnipesaukee River as it connects the outlet of Lake Winnisquam to the north with Silver Lake to the south.

Lochmere has a separate ZIP code (03252) from the rest of the town of Tilton.

See also
 Lochmere Archeological District

References

Unincorporated communities in New Hampshire
Unincorporated communities in Belknap County, New Hampshire